Ten ships of the Royal Navy have borne the name HMS Mutine (the feminine form of the  French name "Mutin", meaning "mutinous" or "joker"):

HMS Mutine was a 14-gun cutter, previously the French ship Mutin.  and  captured her on 2 October 1779. She was commissioned into the Royal Navy as HMS Mutine. She was renamed HMS Pigmy in 1798 and was wrecked in 1805.
 was a 12-gun brig in service in 1795.
 was an 18-gun brig-sloop captured from the French in 1797.  She was sold in 1803.
 was an 18-gun  launched in 1806 and sold in 1819.
 was a 6-gun  launched in 1825 that became a Post Office Packet Service packet, sailing out of Falmouth, Cornwall, in 1826. She was sold into civilian service in 1841 as a whaler, being renamed Aladdin. The Tasmanian Government purchased her in 1885 to use as a powder hulk. She was broken up at Hobart in 1902.
 was a 12-gun brig launched in 1844 and wrecked in 1848.
 was a  sloop launched in 1859 and sold in 1870.
 was a  launched in 1880 and used as a boom defence vessel in 1899.  She was renamed HMS Azov in 1904 and was sold in 1921.
 was a  launched in 1900.  She was used as a survey vessel from 1907 and as a Royal Naval Reserve drill ship from 1925.  She was sold in 1932.
 was an  launched in 1942 and sold in 1966.

Citations

Royal Navy ship names